The 1933 Pau Grand Prix was a motor race held on 19 February 1933 at the Pau circuit, in Pau, Pyrénées-Atlantiques, France. It was the inaugural Pau Grand Prix (i.e. the first race that actually held Grand Prix de Pau title), although the numbering of the races may not have reflected this due to a confusion about the 1901 race at Pau. The Grand Prix was won by Marcel Lehoux, driving the Bugatti T51. Guy Moll finished second and Philippe Étancelin third.

Classification

Race

References

Pau Grand Prix
1933 in French motorsport